Therioherpeton is an extinct genus of small, carnivorous cynodonts belonging to the clade Prozostrodontia, which lived in what is now Brazil during the Late Triassic. Its type species is Therioherpeton cargnini. It was named in 1975 by the palaeontologists José Bonaparte and Mário Costa Barberena based on remains collected in the Hyperodapedon Assemblage Zone of the Santa Maria Formation in the Paraná Basin.

References 

Prehistoric prozostrodonts
Prehistoric cynodont genera
Carnian genera
Late Triassic synapsids of South America
Triassic Brazil
Fossils of Brazil
Santa Maria Formation
Fossil taxa described in 1975
Taxa named by Mário Costa Barberena
Taxa named by José Bonaparte